This page lists all described genera and species of the spider family Prodidominae. , the World Spider Catalog accepts 192 species in 23 genera:

Austrodomus
Austrodomus Simon,1884
 Austrodomus gamsberg Rodrigues & Rheims, 2020 – South Africa
 Austrodomus oxoniensis (Cooke, 1964) – South Africa
 Austrodomus scaber (Purcell, 1904) – South Africa
 Austrodomus zuluensis Lawrence, 1947 – South Africa

Brasilomma
Brasilomma Brescovit, Ferreira & Rheims, 2012
 Brasilomma enigmatica Brescovit, Ferreira & Rheims, 2012 – Brazil

Caudalia
Caudalia Alayón, 1980
 Caudalia insularis Alayón, 1980 – Greater Antilles

Chileomma
Chileomma Platnick, Shadab & Sorkin, 2005
 Chileomma campana Platnick, Shadab & Sorkin, 2005 – Chile
 Chileomma chilensis Platnick, Shadab & Sorkin, 2005 – Chile
 Chileomma franckei Platnick, Shadab & Sorkin, 2005 – Chile
 Chileomma malleco Platnick, Shadab & Sorkin, 2005 – Chile
 Chileomma petorca Platnick, Shadab & Sorkin, 2005 – Chile
 Chileomma rinconada Platnick, Shadab & Sorkin, 2005 – Chile
 Chileomma ruiles Platnick, Shadab & Sorkin, 2005 – Chile

Chileuma
Chileuma Platnick, Shadab & Sorkin, 2005
 Chileuma paposo Platnick, Shadab & Sorkin, 2005 – Chile
 Chileuma renca Platnick, Shadab & Sorkin, 2005 – Chile
 Chileuma serena Platnick, Shadab & Sorkin, 2005 – Chile

Chilongius
Chilongius Platnick, Shadab & Sorkin, 2005
 Chilongius eltofo Platnick, Shadab & Sorkin, 2005 – Chile
 Chilongius frayjorge Platnick, Shadab & Sorkin, 2005 – Chile
 Chilongius huasco Platnick, Shadab & Sorkin, 2005 – Chile
 Chilongius molles Platnick, Shadab & Sorkin, 2005 – Chile
 Chilongius palmas Platnick, Shadab & Sorkin, 2005 – Chile

Eleleis
Eleleis Simon, 1893
 Eleleis crinita Simon, 1893 – South Africa
 Eleleis etosha Rodrigues & Rheims, 2020 – Namibia
 Eleleis haddadi Rodrigues & Rheims, 2020 – South Africa
 Eleleis himba Rodrigues & Rheims, 2020 – Namibia
 Eleleis leleupi Rodrigues & Rheims, 2020 – South Africa
 Eleleis limpopo Rodrigues & Rheims, 2020 – Zambia, South Africa
 Eleleis luderitz Rodrigues & Rheims, 2020 – Namibia
 Eleleis okavango Rodrigues & Rheims, 2020 – Namibia, Botswana
 Eleleis solitaria Rodrigues & Rheims, 2020 – Cape Verde

Indiani
Indiani Rodrigues, Cizauskas & Lemos, 2020
 Indiani gaspar Rodrigues, Cizauskas & Lemos, 2020 – Brazil

Lygromma
Lygromma Simon, 1893
 Lygromma anops Peck & Shear, 1987 – Galapagos Islands
 Lygromma chamberlini Gertsch, 1941 – Panama, Colombia, Cuba
 Lygromma domingo Platnick & Shadab, 1981 – Ecuador
 Lygromma dybasi Platnick & Shadab, 1981 – Costa Rica, Panama
 Lygromma gasnieri 	Brescovit & Höfer, 1993 – Brazil
 Lygromma gertschi Platnick & Shadab, 1981 – Jamaica
 Lygromma huberti Platnick & Shadab, 1981 – Venezuela, Brazil
 Lygromma kochalkai Platnick & Shadab, 1981 – Colombia
 Lygromma nicolae Víquez, 2020 – Costa Rica
 Lygromma peckorum Platnick & Shadab, 1981 – Colombia
 Lygromma peruvianum Platnick & Shadab, 1981 – Peru
 Lygromma quindio Platnick & Shadab, 1981 – Colombia
 Lygromma senoculatum Simon, 1893 – Venezuela
 Lygromma simoni (Berland, 1913) – Ecuador
 Lygromma taruma Brescovit & Bonaldo, 1998 – Brazil
 Lygromma tuxtla Platnick, 1978 – Mexico
 Lygromma valencianum Simon, 1893 – Venezuela
 Lygromma volcan Platnick & Shadab, 1981 – Panama
 Lygromma wygodzinskyi Platnick, 1978 – Colombia

Lygrommatoides
Lygrommatoides Strand, 1918
 Lygrommatoides problematica Strand, 1918 – Japan

Moreno
Moreno Mello-Leitão, 1940
 Moreno chacabuco Platnick, Shadab & Sorkin, 2005 – Chile
 Moreno chivato Platnick, Shadab & Sorkin, 2005 – Chile
 Moreno grande Platnick, Shadab & Sorkin, 2005 – Chile
 Moreno morenoi Mello-Leitão, 1940 – Argentina
 Moreno neuquen Platnick, Shadab & Sorkin, 2005 – Argentina
 Moreno neuquen Platnick, Shadab & Sorkin, 2005 – Argentina

Namundra
Namundra Platnick & Bird, 2007
 Namundra brandberg Platnick & Bird, 2007 – Namibia
 Namundra griffinae Platnick & Bird, 2007 – Namibia
 Namundra kleynjansi Platnick & Bird, 2007 – Namibia
 Namundra leechi Platnick & Bird, 2007 – Angola
 Namundra murphyi Haddad, 2022 – South Africa

Neozimiris
Neozimiris Simon, 1903
 Neozimiris chickeringi Platnick & Shadab, 1976 – Panama
 Neozimiris crinis Platnick & Shadab, 1976 – Mexico
 Neozimiris escandoni Müller, 1987 – Colombia
 Neozimiris exuma Platnick & Shadab, 1976 – Bahama Is.
 Neozimiris levii Platnick & Shadab, 1976 – Curaçao
 Neozimiris nuda Platnick & Shadab, 1976 – Puerto Rico
 Neozimiris pinta Platnick & Shadab, 1976 – Ecuador (Galapagos Is.)
 Neozimiris pinzon Platnick & Shadab, 1976 – Ecuador (Galapagos Is.)
 Neozimiris pubescens (Banks, 1898) – USA, Mexico

Nopyllus
Nopyllus Ott, 2014
 Nopyllus isabelae (Brescovit & Lise, 1993) – Brazil
 Nopyllus vicente Ott, 2014 – Brazil

Paracymbiomma
Paracymbiomma Rodrigues, Cizauskas & Rheims, 2018
 Paracymbiomma angelim Rodrigues, Cizauskas & Rheims, 2018 – Brazil
 Paracymbiomma bocaina Rodrigues, Cizauskas & Rheims, 2018 – Brazil
 Paracymbiomma caecus Rodrigues, Cizauskas & Rheims, 2018 – Brazil
 Paracymbiomma carajas Rodrigues, Cizauskas & Rheims, 2018 – Brazil
 Paracymbiomma doisirmaos Rodrigues, Cizauskas & Rheims, 2018 – Brazil
 Paracymbiomma pauferrense Rodrigues, Cizauskas & Rheims, 2018 – Brazil

Plutonodomus
Plutonodomus Cooke, 1964
 Plutonodomus kungwensis Cooke, 1964 – Tanzania

Prodidomus
Prodidomus Hentz, 1847
 Prodidomus amaranthinus (Lucas, 1846) – Mediterranean
 Prodidomus aurantiacus Simon, 1890 – Yemen
 Prodidomus beattyi Platnick, 1977 – Australia
 Prodidomus bendee Platnick & Baehr, 2006 – Australia
 Prodidomus bicolor Denis, 1957 – Sudan
 Prodidomus birmanicus Thorell, 1897 – Myanmar
 Prodidomus bryantae Alayón, 1995 – Cuba
 Prodidomus capensis Purcell, 1904 – South Africa
 Prodidomus chaperi (Simon, 1884) – India
 Prodidomus clarki Cooke, 1964 – Ascension Island
 Prodidomus dalmasi Berland, 1920 – Kenya
 Prodidomus djibutensis Dalmas, 1919 – Somalia
 Prodidomus domesticus Lessert, 1938 – Congo
 Prodidomus duffeyi Cooke, 1964 – Ascension Island
 Prodidomus flavidus (Simon, 1884) – Algeria
 Prodidomus flavipes Lawrence, 1952 – South Africa
 Prodidomus flavus Platnick & Baehr, 2006 – Australia
 Prodidomus geniculosus Dalmas, 1919 – Tunisia
 Prodidomus granulosus Cooke, 1964 – Rwanda
 Prodidomus hispanicus Dalmas, 1919 – Spain, Greece
 Prodidomus inexpectatus Zamani, Chatzaki, Esyunin & Marusik, 2021 – Iran
 Prodidomus kimberley Platnick & Baehr, 2006 – Australia
 Prodidomus lampeli Cooke, 1964 – Ethiopia
 Prodidomus latebricola Cooke, 1964 – Tanzania
 Prodidomus longiventris (Dalmas, 1919) – Philippines
 Prodidomus margala Platnick, 1976 – Pakistan
 Prodidomus maximus Lessert, 1936 – Mozambique
 Prodidomus nigellus Simon, 1890 – Yemen
 Prodidomus nigricaudus Simon, 1893 – Venezuela
 Prodidomus opacithorax Simon, 1893 – Venezuela
 Prodidomus palkai Cooke, 1972 – India
 Prodidomus papavanasanemensis Cooke, 1972 – India
 Prodidomus purpurascens Purcell, 1904 – South Africa
 Prodidomus purpureus Simon, 1907 – West Africa
 Prodidomus redikorzevi Spassky, 1940 – Turkey, Azerbaijan, Iraq, Iran, Kazakhstan, Turkmenistan
 Prodidomus reticulatus Lawrence, 1927 – Namibia
 Prodidomus revocatus Cooke, 1964 – Mauritius
 Prodidomus robustus Dalmas, 1919 – Ethiopia
 Prodidomus rodolphianus Dalmas, 1919 – East Africa
 Prodidomus rollasoni Cooke, 1964 – Libya
 Prodidomus rufus Hentz, 1847 –  Israel, China, Japan, New Caledonia, USA, Cuba, Argentina, Chile, St. Helena
 Prodidomus saharanpurensis (Tikader, 1982) – India
 Prodidomus sampeyae Platnick & Baehr, 2006 – Australia
 Prodidomus seemani Platnick & Baehr, 2006 – Australia 
 Prodidomus simoni Dalmas, 1919 – South Africa
 Prodidomus singulus Suman, 1967 – Hawaii
 Prodidomus sirohi Platnick, 1976 – India
 Prodidomus stella (Saaristo, 2002) – Seychelles
 Prodidomus tigrinus Dalmas, 1919 – West Africa
 Prodidomus tirumalai Cooke, 1972 – India
 Prodidomus venkateswarai Cooke, 1972 – India
 Prodidomus watongwensis Cooke, 1964 – Tanzania
 Prodidomus woodleigh Platnick & Baehr, 2006 – Australia
 Prodidomus wunderlichi Deeleman-Reinhold, 2001 – Thailand
 Prodidomus yorke Platnick & Baehr, 2006 – Australia

Purcelliana
Purcelliana Cooke, 1964
 Purcelliana cederbergensis Rodrigues & Rheims, 2020 – South Africa
 Purcelliana kamaseb Rodrigues & Rheims, 2020 – Namibia
 Purcelliana khabus Rodrigues & Rheims, 2020 – Namibia
 Purcelliana problematica Cooke, 1964 – South Africa

Theuma
Theuma Simon, 1893
 Theuma ababensis Tucker, 1923 – South Africa
 Theuma andonea Lawrence, 1927 – Namibia
 Theuma aprica Simon, 1893 – South Africa
 Theuma capensis Purcell, 1907 – Botswana, South Africa
 Theuma cedri Purcell, 1907 – South Africa
 Theuma elucubata Tucker, 1923 – South Africa
 Theuma foveolata Tucker, 1923 – South Africa
 Theuma funerea Lawrence, 1928 – Namibia
 Theuma fusca Purcell, 1907 – Namibia, South Africa
 Theuma longipes Lawrence, 1927 – Namibia
 Theuma maculata Purcell, 1907 – South Africa
 Theuma microphthalma Lawrence, 1928 – Namibia
 Theuma mutica Purcell, 1907 – South Africa
 Theuma ovambica Lawrence, 1927 – Namibia
 Theuma parva Purcell, 1907 – South Africa
 Theuma purcelli Tucker, 1923 – South Africa
 Theuma pusilla Purcell, 1908 – Namibia, South Africa
 Theuma recta Lawrence, 1927 – Namibia
 Theuma schreineri Purcell, 1907 – South Africa
 Theuma schultzei Purcell, 1908 – Namibia, South Africa
 Theuma tragardhi Lawrence, 1947 – South Africa
 Theuma velox Purcell, 1908 – Namibia
 Theuma walteri (Simon, 1889) – Turkmenistan
 Theuma xylina Simon, 1893 – South Africa
 Theuma zuluensis Lawrence, 1947 – South Africa

Tivodrassus
Tivodrassus Chamberlin & Ivie, 1936
 Tivodrassus ethophor Chamberlin & Ivie, 1936 – Mexico
 Tivodrassus farias Platnick & Shadab, 1976 – Mexico
 Tivodrassus pecki Platnick & Shadab, 1976 – Mexico
 Tivodrassus reddelli Platnick & Shadab, 1976 – Mexico

Tricongius
Tricongius Simon, 1893
 Tricongius amazonicus Platnick & Höfer, 1990 – Brazil
 Tricongius beltraoae (Brescovit & Ramos, 2003) – Brazil
 Tricongius collinus Simon, 1893 – Venezuela
 Tricongius granadensis Mello-Leitão, 1941 – Colombia
 Tricongius mutilatus (Mello-Leitão, 1940) – Argentina
 Tricongius ribaslangei (Bonaldo & Brescovit, 1997) – Brazil
 Tricongius ybyguara (Rheims & Brescovit, 2004) – Brazil

Zimirina
Zimirina Dalmas, 1919
Zimirina brevipes Pérez & Blasco, 1986 – Spain, Italy (Sardinia)
Zimirina cineris Cooke, 1964 – Canary Is.
Zimirina deserticola Dalmas, 1919 – Algeria
Zimirina gomerae (Schmidt, 1981) – Canary Is.
Zimirina grancanariensis Wunderlich, 1992 – Canary Is.
Zimirina hirsuta Cooke, 1964 – Canary Is.
Zimirina lepida (Blackwall, 1859) – Madeira
Zimirina moyaensis Wunderlich, 1992 – Canary Is.
Zimirina nabavii Wunderlich, 2011 – Canary Is.
Zimirina penicillata (Simon, 1893) (type) – Algeria
Zimirina relegata Cooke, 1977 – St. Helena
Zimirina spinicymbia Wunderlich, 1992 – Canary Is.
Zimirina tenuidens Denis, 1956 – Morocco
Zimirina transvaalica Dalmas, 1919 – South Africa
Zimirina vastitatis Cooke, 1964 – Libya, Egypt

Zimiris
Zimiris Simon, 1882
 Zimiris diffusa Platnick & Penney, 2004 – Yemen, India, St. Helena
 Zimiris doriae Simon, 1882

References

Prodidominae
Prodidominae